Bo Sali is a tambon (subdistrict) of Hot District, in Chiang Mai Province, Thailand. In 2019 it had a total population of 8,026 people.

History
The subdistrict was created effective July 20, 1971 by splitting off 7 administrative villages from Bo Luang.

Administration

Central administration
The tambon is subdivided into 10 administrative villages (muban).

Local administration
The whole area of the subdistrict is covered by the subdistrict administrative organization (SAO) Bo Sali (องค์การบริหารส่วนตำบลบ่อสลี).

References

External links
Thaitambon.com on Bo Sali

Tambon of Chiang Mai province
Populated places in Chiang Mai province